Pelia in Greek mythology is a minor Cypriot figure, kin to Adonis, who played a role in a minor myth.

Mythology 
Pelia had an unspecified kinship with Cinyras, the king of Cyprus, and his son Adonis. Cinyras married her to Melus, a childhood friend of Adonis from Delos. The couple had a son together, whom they also named Melus. The child was raised inside the sanctuary of Aphrodite herself, lover of Adonis. But when Adonis was slain by a boar during hunting, Melus was so distraught over his loss that he ended his life by hanging himself from an apple tree, which took his name thereafter. Pelia, not standing the loss of her kin and her husband both, took her life in the same way. After Aphrodite's own period of mourning was over, she turned Melus into an apple/apple tree, and Pelia into a dove. As for their son, Melus, who was now the only surviving member of Cinyras' family, he was sent back to Delos, where he founded the city Melon. The sheep there also took his name, for he first taught the Delians to shear them and make clothing out of their wool; the Greek  means 'apple' and 'sheep' both.

See also 

 Side (mythology)
 Peristera (mythology)
 Cycnus of Liguria

References

Bibliography 
 Maurus Servius Honoratus, In Vergilii carmina comentarii. Servii Grammatici qui feruntur in Vergilii carmina commentarii; recensuerunt Georgius Thilo et Hermannus Hagen. Georgius Thilo. Leipzig. B. G. Teubner. 1881. Online version at the Perseus Digital Library.
 Smith, William, A Dictionary of Greek and Roman Biography and Mythology. London. John Murray: printed by Spottiswoode and Co., New-Street Square and Parliament Street, 1873.

Deeds of Aphrodite
Metamorphoses into birds in Greek mythology
Women in Greek mythology
Suicides in Greek mythology
Cypriot mythology
Family of Adonis